The Benetton B199 is a Formula One racing car with which the Benetton team competed in the 1999 Formula One season.  It was driven by Giancarlo Fisichella and Alexander Wurz, who were both in their second full seasons with the team. Laurent Redon was the team test driver.

Design and development
The B199 was officially launched in January, 1999 at Enstone by company CEO Rocco Benetton. It was the second car designed by Nick Wirth, who was quoted during the launch as stating the B199 was significantly more aggressive in design than the B198 from the previous season. In late 1998, Benetton had introduced a new wind tunnel on site, and added new sophisticated parts including a front-torque transfer system, and a twin-clutch gearbox. As the team had retained both Fisichella and Wurz from 1998, both drivers were heavily involved in testing and development of the new car. As in previous seasons, the car was dominated by Mild Seven sponsorship and finished in the companies sky blue colour. 

The engines were manufactured by Supertec in an effort between the themselves, Renault and Mecachrome. However, as in 1998 they were badged Playlife to represent one of the Benetton Group companies.

The B199 was extensively tested during pre-season. In Barcelona, the cars were very much in the midfield. By the final Friday of the January test, Fisichella was nearly 2 seconds slower than David Coulthard's McLaren. During February, development tests ran at Silverstone.  The team would also take part in car development tests in June at the circuit, ahead of the British Grand Prix. This gave Redon an opportunity in the car. Over 14 days of testing pre season, the cars completed 4127km.

Racing performance
At the first round in Australia, the cars qualified in 7th and 10th putting them firmly in the midfield. Fisichella was three tenths off Ferrari driver Eddie Irvine's fastest lap, however both cars were around 2 seconds slower than pole-sitter Mika Hakkinen. In the race, Fisichella managed to finish in 4th, whilst Wurz retired with suspension failure. The team failed to score points at the next round in Brazil, whilst Fisichella managed a fifth place at San Marino.  It was Monaco before both cars scored points at the same race, and Wurz got off the mark with a 5th and 6th place respectively.

The B199's crowning moment would come in Canada.  Fisichella scored a podium with a second place finish in the race after starting 7th on the grid.

The remainder of the season would be a myriad of retirements through failures or accidents for the team. The final points scored were at the British Grand Prix, with Wurz managing 5th place. The team would finish the season with 16 points, meaning 6th in the Constructors Championship, their worst finish since Benetton's debut season in 1986.

Complete Formula One results
(key) (results in bold indicate pole position) 

* Denotes Supertec-built engines, badged as Playlife

References

AUTOCOURSE 1999-2000, Henry, Alan (ed.), Hazleton Publishing Ltd. (1999)

External links

B199
1999 Formula One season cars